A Charlie Brown Valentine is the 40th animated television special based on characters from the Charles M. Schulz comic strip Peanuts. It features the Peanuts characters during the week leading up to Valentine's Day. It is the second Valentine's Day-themed Peanuts special, following Be My Valentine, Charlie Brown (1975).

Initially broadcast February 14, 2002 on ABC, A Charlie Brown Valentine was the first new Peanuts special to air on television since 1994's You're in the Super Bowl, Charlie Brown, and the first original special to be televised since Schulz's death in February 2000.

Plot 

This special begins with Charlie Brown sitting on a bench at lunch, trying to get the nerve to talk to the Little Red Haired Girl, but of course, chickening out. He says he feels silly to chicken out, because he knows he is the type of person she would like. The Little Red Haired Girl walks by, and drops her pencil. Charlie Brown notices it, picks it up, and sees it has teethmarks. He realizes, this means she nibbles on her pencil, and is human. Charlie Brown wants to use the Little Red Haired Girl's lost pencil as an excuse to talk to her while returning it to her, but unfortunately, Lucy takes the pencil from Charlie Brown and returns it to the Little Red Haired Girl before Charlie Brown has a chance to.

Later that day, Charlie Brown buys an inexpensive box of chocolates for the Little Red Haired Girl, and decides to hide behind a tree and give it to her, commenting Love makes you do strange things.

Throughout the cartoon Sally Brown tries to make Linus like her but to no avail. As shown after the title card screen, Sally tells Linus that if she holds out her hands, Linus can put a Valentine (or any sort of Valentine gift; like a box of chocolates) in them. Linus replies to her that (trying to avoid her) she can stand like that for the rest of her life forever and never get anything.

The next day, Marcie is seen making a Valentine's card for Charlie Brown, and telling Peppermint Patty that she is very fond of him. Later that day, Marcie goes over to Charlie Brown's house to ask him if he likes her, and all Charlie Brown says is, "Do I what?". Marcie then walks away, angry. Later, Charlie Brown receives a letter saying "I know you like me and I like you". Charlie Brown gets very excited thinking it's from the Little Red Haired Girl, but Peppermint Patty yells at him, telling him "That letter was from me. You like me, Chuck". She leaves Charlie Brown standing there, saying "I do?". And the next day Marcie calls Charlie Brown to ask him if he likes her, and he gets confused again.

Charlie Brown buys the Little Red Haired Girl a valentine, and then he wants to practice giving it to her. He tells Snoopy to pretend to be the little Red Haired Girl while he practices delivering the valentine. When Charlie Brown knocks on his door (while practicing), Snoopy answers with a wig on, which annoys Charlie Brown.

Charlie Brown still does not know what to do about the Little Red Haired Girl. Linus suggests Charlie Brown should invite her to the school Valentine's Day dance. Charlie Brown agrees, but first asks Linus to talk to her to find out if she likes him. Linus goes over and asks her if she likes Charlie Brown. However, the Little Red Haired girl  does not notice there was a kid in their class named Charlie Brown.

Later, in class, Charlie Brown tries to impress the Little Red Haired Girl by winking at her. However, before she can notice him, the teacher sends Charlie Brown to the nurse because she thinks he is winking because his eye hurts him.

The next day, Valentine's Day, Charlie Brown notices the Little Red Haired Girl handing out valentines. He gets excited that she might give him a valentine, but becomes discouraged when she does not give him one.

Later, when Charlie Brown and Linus are at the wall, Linus suggests that Charlie Brown calls her to invite her to the Valentine's Day dance. Charlie Brown says he cannot because he is worried she might hang up in his face. Linus tells him that is the beauty of calling on the phone. If she hangs up on one ear, that is not considered the whole face.

Later, Charlie Brown with Linus dials on the phone, attempting to call the Girl. However, on the other side of the line, Marcie picks up. Charlie Brown realizes he dialed the wrong number. He tells that to Marcie, and Marcie says she understands, and she thinks he probably meant to call Peppermint Patty. She tells him lucky for him, that Patty is here. She gives the phone to Patty. Peppermint Patty asks Charlie Brown if he called to invite her to his school's Valentine's dance, but before Charlie Brown can answer her, she accepts the offer.

That night, Charlie Brown puts on a suit, because he has to go to the ball with Peppermint Patty. He goes to feed Snoopy first, but Snoopy puts on a bowtie and goes with him. When they arrive at the party, Charlie Brown is told that Snoopy can not come in because dogs are not allowed at this party. Charlie Brown tells a lie to the host that Snoopy is really a kid who comes dressed as a dog because he thinks it was a costume party, so Snoopy is allowed.

At the party, Charlie Brown sees Linus, and Linus tells him the Little Red Haired Girl is at the party, so he should ask her to dance with him. Although Charlie Brown decides Linus is right, and starts walking towards the Little Red Haired Girl, getting more nervous with every step he takes, but before he could make it over to her, Peppermint Patty and Marcie find him, and start dancing with him, much to Charlie Brown's annoyance, and when the two girls finally let him go, Charlie Brown realizes the Little Red Haired Girl is already dancing with somebody else, so that somebody else is Snoopy.

After the dance, Peppermint Patty and Marcie complain to Charlie Brown that he is not a good date, as he is a horrible dancer. They also ask that he does not invite them to any more dances.

Charlie Brown is upset because he did not get to dance with the Little Red Haired Girl and did not receive a single valentine. Snoopy brings Charlie Brown a valentine.

Voice actors
 Wesley Singerman - Charlie Brown/Eudora
Corey Padnos - Linus van Pelt 
Lauren Schaffel - Lucy van Pelt
Nicolette Little - Sally Brown
Jessica D. Stone - Marcie 
Emily Lalande - Peppermint Patty 
Christopher Ryan Johnson - Schroeder
 Bill Melendez - Snoopy 
Note: Franklin, Pig-Pen and the Little Red-Haired Girl are silent.

Production notes
A Charlie Brown Valentine was the first Peanuts special to be produced after the 2000 death of Peanuts creator Charles M. Schulz. It also marked the third time a Peanuts special was animated with digital ink and paint as opposed to traditional cel animation (the first one to do so was It Was My Best Birthday Ever, Charlie Brown in 1997.) It also utilized the drawing style similar to the comic strip, with a white outline around Lucy's short hair and Snoopy's long ears (this was dropped in future specials).

A Charlie Brown Valentine also depicts the Little Red-Haired Girl in full view, though she remains unnamed in this special, in contrast to her first full-view appearance in It's Your First Kiss, Charlie Brown (1977) when she was named Heather. She also does not resemble the "Heather" version in any way; that version last appeared in the 1988 special Snoopy!!! The Musical.

Music score
The bulk of the music score in A Charlie Brown Valentine consists of classic melodies composed by Vince Guaraldi, some tunes which had only been utilized once ("Heartburn Waltz"). Other more notable tunes, such as "Charlie Brown Theme", "Peppermint Patty" and a jazz/rock version of the franchise signature tune, "Linus and Lucy", were used as well. All themes were performed and arranged by David Benoit.

"Heartburn Waltz" (version 1)
"Peppermint Patty" (version 1)
"Pebble Beach" (version 1)
"Linus and Lucy"
"Blue Charlie Brown"
"Heartburn Waltz" (version 2)
"Heartburn Waltz" (version 3)
"Peppermint_Patty" (version 2)
"Heartburn Waltz" (version 4)
"Oh, Good Grief" (version 1) (Vince Guaraldi, Lee Mendelson)
"Heartburn Waltz" (version 5)
"Pebble Beach" (version 2)
"Heartburn Waltz" (version 6)
"You're in Love, Charlie Brown" (version 1)
"Heartburn Waltz" (version 7)
"Charlie Brown Theme" (version 1) (Vince Guaraldi, Lee Mendelson)
"Oh, Good Grief" (version 2) (Vince Guaraldi, Lee Mendelson)
"Heartburn Waltz" (version 8)
"Charlie Brown Theme" (version 2) (Vince Guaraldi, Lee Mendelson)
"You're in Love, Charlie Brown" (version 2)
"Linus and Lucy"
"Oh, Good Grief" (version 3) (Vince Guaraldi, Lee Mendelson)
"Heartburn Waltz" (version 9)

Release 
A Charlie Brown Valentine was first broadcast on February 14, 2002. The special was then released to VHS and DVD on January 6, 2004 along with two bonus specials, There's No Time for Love, Charlie Brown and Someday You'll Find Her, Charlie Brown, retailing at $14.98. Although it originally aired on ABC, the network edits a few parts out to make time for station commercials, with the original version of the special being 25 minutes. In December 2010, Warner Home Video re-released the special on DVD with Someday You'll Find Her, Charlie Brown as a bonus special. The special was added to Apple TV+ on February 9, 2023.

Reception 
A Charlie Brown Valentine received an extremely positive response. When the special re-aired on February 8, 2008, it attracted 5.36 million viewers, placing it at #2 on the primetime TV ratings for that night.  In 2009, it was re-aired by ABC on Valentine's Day, immediately after Be My Valentine, Charlie Brown. In 2010, it was viewed by 7.51 million viewers coming 2nd in the timeslot.

References

External links

Peanuts television specials
2002 television specials
American Broadcasting Company television specials
Television shows directed by Bill Melendez
2000s American television specials
2000s animated television specials
Valentine's Day television specials